Ardmore is a town in Limestone County, Alabama, United States, and is included in the Huntsville-Decatur Metro Area. It is home to the Saturn IB rocket at the Alabama Welcome Center, just south of the Tennessee border, on Interstate 65. As of the 2010 census, the population of the town is 1,194. It borders its sister city Ardmore, Tennessee.

History
The settlement was originally named Austin, after Alex Austin, who selected the location as a site for a station along the Louisville and Nashville Railroad. The railroad company later renamed the town Ardmore, for the community of Ardmore, Pennsylvania. Ardmore, Alabama was incorporated in 1922.

Geography
Ardmore is located at  (34.987052, -86.843228). It is the northernmost settlement in the state of Alabama. The town is concentrated along Alabama State Route 53, which runs south to north along Ardmore Avenue before veering east along the state line, where it runs congruent with Tennessee State Route 7 on Main Street. Interstate 65, which connects Nashville and Birmingham, passes just west of Ardmore.

Main Street is the state line. The road heading northbound/westbound is in Tennessee, while southbound/eastbound is in Alabama.

Demographics

Ardmore first appeared on the 1930 U.S. Census as an incorporated town.

2000 Census data
At the 2000 census there were 1,034 people, 460 households, and 276 families in the town. The racial makeup of the town was 96.23% White, 0.87% Black or African American, 0.48% Native American, 0.77% Asian, 0.10% Pacific Islander, 1.16% from other races, and 0.39% from two or more races. 1.74% were Hispanic or Latino of any race.

Of the 460 households 27.0% had children under the age of 18 living with them, 43.0% were married couples living together, 11.5% had a female householder with no husband present, and 39.8% were non-families. 36.5% of households were made up of individuals, and 21.1% were one person aged 65 or older. The average household size was 2.25, and the average family size was 2.96.

The age distribution was 25.0% under the age of 18, 8.3% from 18 to 24, 25.7% from 25 to 44, 24.6% from 45 to 64, and 16.4% 65 or older. The median age was 37 years. For every 100 females, there were 81.4 males. For every 100 females age 18 and over, there were 78.0 males.

The median household income was $28,352 and the median family income  was $40,673. Males had a median income of $29,531 versus $19,875 for females. The per capita income for the town was $18,447. About 10.7% of families and 17.9% of the population were below the poverty line, including 20.2% of those under age 18 and 30.7% of those age 65 or over.

2010 census
At the 2010 census there were 1,194 people, 505 households, and 333 families in the town. The racial makeup of the town was 94.3% White, 1.9% Black or African American, 0.8% Native American, 0.9% Asian, 0.1% Pacific Islander, .6% from other races, and 1.4% from two or more races. 1.3%. were Hispanic or Latino of any race.

Of the 505 households 28.1% had children under the age of 18 living with them, 44.8% were married couples living together, 15.4% had a female householder with no husband present, and 34.1% were non-families. 31.5% of households were made up of individuals, and 18.5% were one person aged 65 or older. The average household size was 2.36, and the average family size was 2.97.

The age distribution was 24.9% under the age of 18, 10.7% from 18 to 24, 25.7% from 25 to 44, 21.9% from 45 to 64, and 16.8% 65 or older. The median age was 37.1 years. For every 100 females, there were 82.3 males. For every 100 females age 18 and over, there were 90.7 males.

The median household income was $32,196 and the median family income  was $36,779. Males had a median income of $31,600 versus $37,841 for females. The per capita income for the town was $18,931. About 13.0% of families and 18.8% of the population were below the poverty line, including 21.9% of those under age 18 and 19.2% of those age 65 or over.

2020 census

As of the 2020 United States census, there were 1,321 people, 520 households, and 321 families residing in the town.

Historic Demographics

Education
It is in the Limestone County School District.

There is a high school in Ardmore, Alabama called “Ardmore High School” and it has  around 1,008 students. The high school consists of two separate parts: the middle school, where grades six through eight attend, and the high school, where grades nine through twelve attend. 
The school was founded in 1915; the five acres of land cost a total of five dollars and was generously donated to the school. Residents of Ardmore helped construct the school building for an entire year. The original school building was only two stories tall. There were classrooms, a library, and a study hall area on the first floor, and they put a stage on the second floor of the building.

In 1917, the doors of the school opened to welcome its first students. Ten years later, Ardmore High School received its accreditation.

The school's mission statement since its opening has been: "The mission and purpose of Ardmore High School is to provide appropriate learning opportunities that promote academic, physical, and ethical growth of students enabling them to become productive citizens in an ever-changing society."

In popular culture
Ardmore is the setting of a song by Old Crow Medicine Show called "Alabama High-Test," on the album Tennessee Pusher.

Notable person
 David Fanning, country music singer, songwriter, and record producer

Photo Gallery

References

Notes

References

External links

1922 establishments in Alabama
Towns in Limestone County, Alabama
Towns in Alabama
Huntsville-Decatur, AL Combined Statistical Area